John Wheatley (1869–1930) was a Scottish politician.

John Wheatley may also refer to:

 John Wheatley (cricketer) (1860–1962), cricketer from New Zealand
 John Laviers Wheatley (1892–1955), Welsh painter and printmaker
 John Wheatley, Baron Wheatley (1908–1988), Scottish politician
 John Wheatley, Lord Wheatley (born 1941), Scottish lawyer and judge
 John Wheatley (physicist) (1927–1986), American experimental physicist
 John Wheatley (actor), British actor active since the 1970s